Dombegyház is a village in Békés County, in the Southern Great Plain region of south-east Hungary.

Geography
It covers an area of 57.96 km² and has a population of 2431 people (2002).

Detailed information (in Hungarian)
Further information and pictures about Dombegyház are available at the official page http://www.dombegyhaz.hu (external link in Hungarian).

External links

  in Hungarian

Populated places in Békés County